Kārlis Šadurskis (born 11 October 1959) is a Latvian politician, who was a Member of the European Parliament for Latvia from 2011 until 2014. He is a member of the Unity party and sat with the European People's Party in the European Parliament.

Education and career
Šadurskis graduated mathematical engineering from Riga Technical University in 1982. He subsequently graduated as a doctor of technology 1986 and as a doctor of  mathematics from the University of Latvia in 1992. He served as a senior research fellow, assistant professor, teacher, associate professor at the Riga Technical University from 1986. He also served in various other academic roles.

He was elected to the Saeima in 2002, and served until 2011. He was the Minister of Education and Science of Latvia from 2002 to 2004. He later served as Parliamentary Secretary to the Ministry of Defence of Latvia from 2009 until 2010. He was Secretary of the Latvian Parliament from 2010 to 2011.

Parliamentary service
Delegation for relations with South Africa (2011-)
Committee on the Environment, Public Health and Food Safety (2011-2012), (2012-)

References

1959 births
Living people
Politicians from Riga
Latvian National Independence Movement politicians
New Era Party politicians
Civic Union (Latvia) politicians
New Unity politicians
Government ministers of Latvia
Deputies of the 8th Saeima
Deputies of the 9th Saeima
Deputies of the 10th Saeima
Deputies of the 12th Saeima
MEPs for Latvia 2009–2014
MEPs for Latvia 2014–2019
Riga Technical University alumni
University of Latvia alumni
Academic staff of Riga Technical University